The 2006–07 season was the 21st season in the history of ES Troyes AC and the club's second consecutive season in the top flight of French football. In addition to the domestic league, Troyes participated in this season's edition of the Coupe de France and the Coupe de la Ligue.

Players

First-team squad

Pre-season and friendlies

Competitions

Overall record

Ligue 1

League table

Results summary

Results by round

Matches

Coupe de France

Coupe de la Ligue

Statistics

Appearances and goals

|-
! colspan=14 style=background:#DCDCDC; text-align:center| Goalkeepers

|-
! colspan=14 style=background:#DCDCDC; text-align:center| Defenders

|-
! colspan=14 style=background:#DCDCDC; text-align:center| Midfielders

|-
! colspan=14 style=background:#DCDCDC; text-align:center| Forwards

References

ES Troyes AC seasons
Troyes